The hyphen is a punctuation mark.

Hyphen may also refer to:
Hyphen-minus (-), one computer character encoding for the mark 
Hyphen (mHablen e), an Asian-American magazine
Hyphen (fanzine), a science fiction fanzine
Hyphen (architecture), an architectural element
Ryan Rowland-Smith, a pitcher for the Houston Astros of Major League Baseball whose nickname is Hyphen
Sheldon-Primghar Hyphens, an Iowa minor league baseball team in the 1902 and 1903 seasons